Alvin Leavon Robinson (born July 16, 1982) is an American professional mixed martial artist currently fighting as a lightweight for the Bellator Fighting Championships. He is a former Ring of Fire lightweight champion. He holds a professional record of 13 wins and seven losses.

Biography

Alvin has 4 brothers and 3 sisters named Kenneth Leckie Robinson, Thomas Robinson, Daniel Robinson and Michael Robinson, Rosalina, Tenisha, and Rachael.

Mixed martial arts career
Robinson is a black belt in Brazilian Jiu-Jitsu under Royce Gracie. Robinson became the Ring of Fire lightweight champion by defeating Luke Caudillo by rear naked choke in the first round on December 10, 2005.

Robinson made his UFC debut at UFC 73 against The Ultimate Fighter's Kenny Florian on July 7, 2007. Robinson was defeated in the 1st round. Florian tripped Robinson to the mat before moving to side-control. Florian then transitioned into mount before pounding away until Robinson tapped due to strikes.

He defeated Jorge Gurgel via unanimous decision at UFC 77.

Robinson signed with Bellator Fighting Championships to face Georgi Karakhanyan on September 9, 2010, in New Orleans. However, Robinson was forced out of the bout due to an injury and was replaced by Anthony Leone.

Mixed martial arts record

|-
| Win
|align=center| 15–9
| Josh Huber
| Submission (arm-triangle choke)
| FTW – Prize Fighting Championship 12
| 
|align=center|1
|align=center|3:15
|Denver, Colorado, United States
|
|-
| Loss
|align=center| 14–9
| Ricky Musgrave
| TKO (punches)
| RFA 22 – Smith vs Njokuani
| 
|align=center|1
|align=center|3:55
|Colorado Springs, Colorado, United States
|
|-
| Win
|align=center| 14–8
| Fabio Serrao
| Submission (rear naked choke)
| RFA 20 – Sanders vs. Mercado
| 
| align=center|1
| align=center|3:14
| Broomfield, Colorado, United States
|
|-
| Loss
|align=center| 13–8
| Gleristone Santos
| TKO (punches)
|  Titan FC 28: Brilz vs. Davis
| 
|align=center|2
|align=center|4:51
|Newkirk, Oklahoma, United States
|
|-
|Win
|align=center|13–7
| Joey Munoz
|Submission
|Kick Down MMA 110 – Enforcers
|
|align=center|1
|align=center|0:42
|Denver, Colorado, United States
|
|-
|Loss
|align=center|12–7
| Daniel Mason-Straus
|Submission (rear naked choke)
|Bellator 78
|
|align=center|2
|align=center|4:51
|Dayton, Ohio, United States
|
|-
|Win
|align=center|12–6
| Adam Lorenz
|Technical Submission (rear naked choke)
|AMMA 8: Unfinished Business
|
|align=center|1
|align=center|0:54
|Edmonton, Alberta, Canada
|Won Aggression MMA Featherweight Championship
|-
|Loss
|align=center|11–6
| Cameron Dollar
|Submission (rear naked choke)
|Fight to Win: Mortal Combat
|
|align=center|1
|align=center|4:59
|Denver, Colorado, United States
|
|-
|Win
|align=center| 11–5
| Jesse Henley
|Submission (rear naked choke)	
|Fight to Win / King of Champions: Worlds Collide 
|
|align=center|1
|align=center|1:38
|Denver, Colorado, United States
|
|-
|Win
|align=center| 10–5
|  Brandon Girtz
|Submission (rear naked choke)	
|Cage Fighting Xtreme
|
|align=center|2
|align=center|1:37
|Red Lake, Minnesota, United States
|
|-
|Loss
|align=center| 9–5
|Anthony Morrison
|Submission (punches) 	
|ROF 36 – Demolition
|
|align=center|1
|align=center|1:09
|Denver, Colorado, United States
|Drops to Featherweight
|-
|Loss
|align=center| 9–4
| Mark Bocek
|Submission (rear naked choke) 	
|UFC 91
|
|align=center|3
|align=center|3:16
|Las Vegas, Nevada, United States
|
|-
|Loss
|align=center| 9–3
| Nate Diaz
|Submission (triangle choke) 	
|UFC Fight Night 12
|
|align=center|1
|align=center|3:39
|Las Vegas, Nevada, United States
|
|-
|Win
|align=center| 9–2
| Jorge Gurgel
|Decision (unanimous)
|UFC 77
|
|align=center|3
|align=center|5:00
|Cincinnati, Ohio, United States
|
|-
|Loss
|align=center| 8–2
|  Kenny Florian
|Submission (punches)
|UFC 73
|
|align=center|1
|align=center|4:30
|Sacramento, California, United States
|
|-
|Win
|align=center| 8–1
| Olly Bradstreet
| Submission (rear naked choke)
| ROF 28: Evolution 
| 
|align=center| 1
|align=center| 1:47
|Broomfield, Colorado, United States
|
|-
|Win
|align=center| 7–1
| Rocky Johnson
| Submission (rear naked choke)
| ROF 27: Collision Course
| 
|align=center| 1
|align=center| 2:27
|Denver, Colorado, United States
|
|-
|Win
|align=center| 6–1
| Marshall Martin
| Submission (side choke)
| Fight Force: Butte Brawl 2
| 
|align=center| 1
|align=center| 3:54
|Butte, Montana, United States
|
|-
|Loss
|align=center| 5–1
| Fabio Holanda
| TKO (punches)
| TKO Major League MMA 25: Confrontation
| 
|align=center| 2
|align=center| 4:30
|Montreal, Quebec, Canada
|
|-
|Win
|align=center| 5–0
| James Martinez
| Submission (triangle choke)
| ROF 23: Impact
| 
|align=center| 1
|align=center| 1:14
|Colorado, United States
|
|-
|Win
|align=center| 4–0
| Luke Caudillo
| Submission (rear naked choke)
| ROF 20: Elite
| 
|align=center| 1
|align=center| 1:33
|Castle Rock, Colorado, United States
|Won ROF Lightweight Championship
|-
|Win
|align=center| 3–0
| Alonzo Martinez
| Submission (rear naked choke)
| ROF 19: Showdown
| 
|align=center| 2
|align=center| 1:14
|Castle Rock, Colorado, United States
|
|-
|Win
|align=center| 2–0
| Josh Arocho
| Submission (triangle choke)
| ROF 17: Unstoppable
| 
|align=center| 1
|align=center| 0:44
|Castle Rock, Colorado, United States
|
|-
|Win
|align=center| 1–0
| Eric Payne
| Submission (rear naked choke)
| ROF 15: Inferno
| 
|align=center| 1
|align=center| 2:54
|Colorado, United States
|

References

External links
 
 

Living people
American male mixed martial artists
Mixed martial artists utilizing Brazilian jiu-jitsu
American practitioners of Brazilian jiu-jitsu
People awarded a black belt in Brazilian jiu-jitsu
1982 births
Ultimate Fighting Championship male fighters